Calomboloca  is a village and commune in the municipality of Ícolo e Bengo, Luanda Province, Angola. The small village of Cassoneca is located in the commune.

References

Populated places in Luanda Province
Communes in Luanda Province